The Federal Reserve Bank of Atlanta, (informally referred to as the Atlanta Fed and the Bank), is the sixth district of the 12 Federal Reserve Banks of the United States and is headquartered in midtown Atlanta, Georgia.

The Atlanta Fed covers the U.S. states of Alabama, Florida, and Georgia, the eastern two-thirds of Tennessee, the southern portion of  Louisiana, and southern Mississippi as part of the Federal Reserve System. Along with its Atlanta headquarters, the Banks operates five branches with the sixth district, which are located in Birmingham, Jacksonville, Miami, Nashville, and New Orleans. These branches provide cash to banks, savings and loans, and other depository institutions; transfer money electronically; and clear millions of checks.

In addition to supporting the U.S. financial system, the Atlanta Fed carries out the supervision and regulation of the banks operating within the sixth district. It also is a source of research and expertise for public and private decision makers within the district. In recent years, researchers within the Atlanta Fed have innovated new tools to gauge the health of the macro U.S. economy, the two most notable are GDPNow and Wage Growth Tracker.

The Atlanta Fed is currently led by Dr. Raphael Bostic, who was appointed in 2017 and is a member of the Federal Open Market Committee (FOMC), the  committee that makes key decisions about interest rates and the growth of the United States money supply.

Responsibilities and functions

The Atlanta Fed's footprint covers the southeastern U.S., including the states of Alabama, Florida, and Georgia, 74 counties in the eastern two-thirds of Tennessee, 38 parishes of southern Louisiana, and 43 counties of southern Mississippi as part of the Federal Reserve System.

The Atlanta Fed, along with the other 11 regional district banks, has three primary functions: assisting with monetary policy, operation of nationwide payment system, and administering bank supervision and regulation.  Its job is to decide the interest rates, and the president meets with other bank presidents and board members. The bank's board of directors makes recommendations on the levels of discount rates.

Secondarily, the Atlanta Fed is a source of research and expertise for public and private decision makers within the district. Researchers within the Atlanta Fed have innovated new tools to gauge the health of the macro U.S. economy, the two most notable are  GDPNow Wage Growth Tracker.
The Wage Growth Tracker is a measure of the nominal wage growth of individuals, using microdata from the Current Population Survey (CPS) from the Bureau of Labor Statistics.

Leadership

The Bank is governed by a Board of Directors, which is drawn from the sixth district's business community, banks, and labor and consumer organizations, and makes recommendations every two weeks on the level of the discount rate, which is the rate at which the Bank lends to commercial banks.

The Bank's staff is led by Dr. Raphael Bostic, who was appointed in 2017 and is member of the Federal Open Market Committee (FOMC).

Governors and presidents
With the appointment of President Bostic in 2017, there have been 15 chief executive officers of the Atlanta Fed. The title of Reserve Bank chief executive officer was changed to president by the Banking Act of 1935.

Board of directors
The following people are on the board of directors :

All terms expire on December 31.

Headquarters

Since 2001, the Atlanta Fed has been located at 1000 Peachtree Street NE in Midtown Atlanta.  Prior to 2001, the bank was located in downtown Atlanta at 104 Marietta Street NW, which is now the home of the State Bar of Georgia.

The bank hosts the Atlanta Monetary Museum at its building.

Branches
 Federal Reserve Bank of Atlanta Birmingham Branch Office
 Federal Reserve Bank of Atlanta Jacksonville Branch Office
 Federal Reserve Bank of Atlanta Miami Branch Office
 Federal Reserve Bank of Atlanta New Orleans Branch Office
 Federal Reserve Bank of Atlanta Nashville Branch Office

See also

 Federal Reserve Act
 Federal Reserve Bank
 Federal Reserve Branches
 Federal Reserve Districts
 Federal Reserve System
 Structure of the Federal Reserve System

References

External links 

 Federal Reserve Bank of Atlanta
 Federal Reserve Bank Presidents 
 Historical resources by and about the Federal Reserve Bank of Atlanta including annual reports back to 1915

Atlanta
Economy of the Southeastern United States
Robert A. M. Stern buildings
New Classical architecture